LISICON is an acronym for LIthium Super Ionic CONductor, which refers to a family of solids with the chemical formula Li2+2xZn1−xGeO4.

The weaker bonds allow for the lithium ions to easily move from site to site, not needing to break strong bonds to do so.  Also, this structure forms large “bottlenecks” between the interstitial positions which these ions occupy, additionally lowering the energy required to move from site to site. These two factors allow for the lithium ions to diffuse quickly and easily through the structure. However, because of the shape of the channels through which these lithium ions can diffuse, they are limited to 2 dimensional diffusion. LISICON compounds have relatively high ionic conductivity, on the order of 10−6 S/cm at 25 °C. LISICONs readily react with lithium metal and atmospheric gases such as CO2; as a result, their conductivity decreases with time.

LISICON-Like Materials 
There are other LISICON type solid electrolytes which make use of other elements to achieve higher ionic conductivities.  One such material has the chemical formula of Li(3+x)GexV(1-x)O4, where the value of x is between 0 and 1. There are two compositions, Li3.5Ge0.5V0.5O4 and Li3.6Ge0.6V0.4O4, which had ionic conductivities of 4*10−5 S/cm and 10−5 S/cm, an order of magnitude of improvement upon the base LISICON structure.  These materials show good thermal stability and are stable in contact with CO2 and ambient atmosphere, dealing with some problems extant with the original structure.

There are materials with the chemical structure of Li(4-x)Si(1-x)PxO4.  This is a solid solution between Li4SiO4 and Li3PO4.  This solid solution can be formed over the whole composition range at room temperature.  The highest ionic conductivity are achieved at compositions of Li3.5Si0.5P0.5O4 and Li3.4Si0.4P0.6, with conductivity on the order of 10−6 S/cm.  This results from the substitution of some Si4+ for P5+ in the lattice, resulting in the addition of interstitial Li-ions which diffuse much more easily.  The ionic conductivity is further improved with the doping of Cl− to replace O2- in the lattice.  The compositions Li10.42Si1.5P1.5Cl11.92 and Li10.42Ge1.5P1.5Cl11.92 achieved ionic conductivities of 1.03 * 10−5 S/cm and 3.7*10−5 S/cm respectively.  This is theorized to be the due to the widening of the “bottlenecks” between interstitial points due to the Cl− ions smaller size, and the weakening of the ionic bonding Li+ ions experienced due to chlorine's lower electronegativity.

The conductivities are almost 100 times higher in thio-LISICONs, where oxygen is replaced by sulfur, i.e. the corresponding thiosilicates.  The bonding between S2- and Li+ is weaker than that between O2- and Li+, allowing for the Li+ in the sulfide structure to be far more normal than its oxide counterparts.  Ceramic thio-LISCON materials based on the chemical formula Li(4-x)Ge(1-x)PxS4 are promising electrolyte materials, with ionic conductivities on the order of 10−3 S/m or 10−2 S/m.

Applications 
LISICONs can be used as the solid electrolyte in lithium-based solid-state batteries, such as solid state nickel–lithium battery.  For this application, solid lithium electrolytes require ionic conductivities greater than 10−4 S/cm, negligible electronic conductivity, and a wide range of electrochemcial stability.

References

Electrochemistry